The Deinococcus/Thermus Holin (D/T-Hol) Family (TC# 1.E.41) consists of a single protein with no close homologues (Putative holin of Meiothermus silvanus,TC# 1.E.41.1.1); however, its distant homology to members of the Holin superfamily III suggest an evolutionary relationship. The putative holin of Meiothermus silvanus is 108 amino acyl residues in length and possesses 3 transmembrane segments.

See also 
 Holins
 Lysins
 Holin superfamily III
 Transporter Classification Database

References 

Protein families
Membrane proteins
Transmembrane proteins
Transmembrane transporters
Transport proteins
Integral membrane proteins